Moussa Paul Bakayoko (born 27 December 1996) is an Ivorian footballer who plays as a midfielder or winger for Havant & Waterlooville.

Club career

Before the 2015 season, Bakayoko signed for Raja, one of Morocco's most successful clubs, after playing for USC Bassam in the Ivorian second division.

Before the second half of 2016/17, he signed for Armenian side Shirak.

In January 2020 season, Bakayoko signed for Derry City in Northern Ireland on a one-year contract.

In 2020, Bakayoko signed for English sixth division team Dartford before leaving the club at the start of 2021. After leaving Dartford, Bakayoko then signed for Havant & Waterlooville at the start of 2021.

On 5 August 2022, Shirak announced the return of Bakayoko.

International career
Bakayoko represented Ivory Coast at the 2013 FIFA U-17 World Cup.

References

External links
 
 

Expatriate footballers in England
Dartford F.C. players
1996 births
Armenian Premier League players
Botola players
Derry City F.C. players
FC Shirak players
Havant & Waterlooville F.C. players
Expatriate association footballers in Northern Ireland
Expatriate footballers in Armenia
Living people
Association football midfielders
Association football wingers
Ivorian footballers
Ivorian expatriate sportspeople in Northern Ireland
Expatriate footballers in Morocco
Ivorian expatriate sportspeople in Morocco
Ivorian expatriate sportspeople in Armenia
Ivorian expatriate sportspeople in England
Ivorian expatriate footballers
Raja CA players